Estonia participated in The V. Winter Paralympic Games in Tignes-Albertville, France.

Estonia entered 1 athlete in the following sports:
Cross-country skiing: 1 female

Medalists

The 1992 Estonian Paralympic Team

Cross-country skiing

 Vilma Nugis

Results by event

Cross-country skiing 

 Vilma Nugis 
 Women's Short Distance 5 km B2-3 – Finish time: 19.58,9 (→ 5. place )
 Women's Long Distance 10 km B2-3 – Finish time: 54.51,8 (→ 5. place )

See also
1992 Winter Paralympics
Estonia at the Paralympics
Estonia at the 1992 Winter Olympics

External links
International Paralympic Committee
 Estonian Paralympic Committee

Nations at the 1992 Winter Paralympics
1992 Winter
Paralympics